Margaret Foster is an American film and television actress. Some of her many roles were in the 1979 TV miniseries version of The Scarlet Letter, and the films Ticket to Heaven, The Osterman Weekend, and They Live.

Early years
Foster was born in Reading, Pennsylvania to David and Nancy (née Adamson) Foster on May 14, 1948, and grew up in Rowayton, Connecticut with four siblings: sisters Gray, Jan, and Nina, and brother Ian. She studied acting at the Neighborhood Playhouse School of the Theatre in New York.

Career 
In 1968, Foster acted in a Cornell Summer Theater production of John Brown's Body. Later in 1968, she was in the off-Broadway production of The Empire Builders.

When Loretta Swit was unable to reprise her television-film role of Detective Christine Cagney when the film was adapted into the Cagney & Lacey TV series, Foster took on the role for the short (six episodes) first season, before she was replaced by Sharon Gless. Entertainment columnist Dick Kleiner wrote in August 1982 about Foster's being dropped from the show: "It isn't a pretty story, no matter who you talk to. Meg was so hurt and distraught that she still isn't talking. But she told friends that she felt as though she had been hit by a truck." Kleiner's story implied that Foster's dismissal from the show had cost her other opportunities. "Until that news spread," he wrote, "she was an in-demand actress."

Foster worked throughout the 1970s, 1980s and 1990s. She guest-starred in numerous TV shows including two episodes of Hawaii Five-O (1973 and 1976), The Six Million Dollar Man season two episode "Straight on 'til Morning" (1974), Three for the Road (1975), and the Star Trek: Deep Space Nine season four episode "The Muse" (1996).

Other TV shows include Bonanza, The Twilight Zone, The F.B.I., Here Come the Brides, Storefront Lawyers, Barnaby Jones, Murder, She Wrote, Miami Vice, Mannix, The Cosby Show, Quantum Leap, ER.  She also portrayed Hera in Hercules: The Legendary Journeys and Xena: Warrior Princess. .

She also appeared in films throughout the 1980s, beginning with a role as a woman who worked in the games in a traveling carnival in Carny, starring Jodie Foster (no relation), Gary Busey and Robbie Robertson; the villainous Evil-Lyn in the big-screen version of Masters of the Universe; and Holly in the John Carpenter film They Live, with "Rowdy" Roddy Piper.

She was nominated for a 1982 Genie Award for Best Performance by a Foreign Actress for the film Ticket to Heaven. Since the 1990s, Foster has acted mainly in stage productions, including King Lear and Barabbas.

Foster's striking pale-blue eyes were dubbed "the eyes of 1979" by Mademoiselle magazine. In a newspaper interview that year, she said in her opinion, her eyes were not "so distinctive". However, some film and television producers had Foster wear contact lenses to lessen what they considered her eyes' "distractive" effect.

Personal life
Foster is divorced from Canadian actor Stephen McHattie. She has a son, Christopher.

Filmography

Films

Television films

Television series

References

External links

Living people
20th-century American actresses
21st-century American actresses
1948 births
Actors from Reading, Pennsylvania
Actresses from Pennsylvania
American film actresses
American stage actresses
American television actresses
Neighborhood Playhouse School of the Theatre alumni